Krispl is a municipality in the Hallein district in the Austrian state of Salzburg.

References

Cities and towns in Hallein District